DD Microscopii, also known as CD−43°14304, is a binary star system in the constellation Microscopium. The system has a combined average apparent magnitude around 11, making it readily visible in telescopes but not to the naked eye. It is thought to be at a distance of one or two thousand parsecs, although parallax measurements place the system at a distance of around 30,000 light years.

It is a symbiotic star system composed of an orange giant with a class of either K2 III or K5/M0 IIIe. Both stellar classifications of the primary indicate a red giant, but one has a regular spectrum while the other shows an evolved star with the characteristics of a K5 and M0 giant star plus emission lines in its spectrum. The secondary is a  white dwarf in close orbit, ionizing the stellar wind of the larger star. The giant star and white dwarf both take about 4 years to orbit each other.

The star system has its origin in the galactic halo of the Milky Way as indicated by the high galactic latitude. DD Microscopii is cataloged as a Z Andromedae variable, a type of symbiotic binary with occasional outbursts. It fluctuates between magnitudes 11.0 and 11.7 over a span of almost 400 days.

References

Microscopium
Microscopii, DD
K-type giants
White dwarfs
Z Andromedae variables
CD-43 14304